The women's park competition at the 2018 Asian Games took place on 29 August 2018 at the JSC Skateboard Stadium.

Schedule
All times are Western Indonesia Time (UTC+07:00)

Results
Legend
DNS — Did not finish

References

External links
Official website

Women's park